Andrey Nikolayevich Kovalchuk (b. 7 September 1959 in Moscow, Soviet Union) is a Russian sculptor. He holds the title of People's Artist of the Russian Federation (awarded in 2003) and is the winner of the Moscow City Hall Prize for Literature and the Arts (1999) and the Russian Federation Government Prize for Culture (2005).

Kovalchuks works embody his deep interest in Russian history. Among his many sculptural compositions are monuments to Peter the Great in Astrakhan, Admiral Fyodor Ushakov (1745–1817) in Moscow, and the outstanding poet and diplomat Fyodor Tyutchev (1803–1873) in Bryansk and Munich.

Kovalchuk commemorated the feats of soldiers in the German-Soviet War in a multi-figure composition, "Soldier-Road Workers" in Moscow Region. His memorial "To the Victims of Chernobyl" is charged with emotion.

One of the sculptor''s most recent works, a monument to the pilots of the Normandy-Neman Squadron, was unveiled in October 2007 by the presidents of Russia and France.

Kovalchuk's compositions are distinguished by their strong sense of proportion, vividness of image and the accuracy with which they capture the subject's psychological characteristics. Vivid examples include the image of Ivan the Terrible torn by inner drama, Nikolai Gogol filled with the subtle tension and anxiety, Alexander Pushkin lifted by the wings of inspiration, noble Ivan Bunin steeped in human dignity, plastic interpretations of etchings by the Spanish artist Goya and a whole host of other works.

References

Sources

1959 births
Living people
People's Artists of Russia
21st-century Russian sculptors
20th-century Russian sculptors
20th-century Russian male artists
Russian male sculptors
21st-century Russian male artists